Inglewood is a closed railway station on the Marton - New Plymouth Line in Inglewood, New Zealand. Currently freight trains go past the station. It was built in the 1870s.

References 

Defunct railway stations in New Zealand
Rail transport in Taranaki